Ansford is a village and civil parish in Somerset, England, situated on the northern edge of Castle Cary in the South Somerset district.  The civil parish has a population of approximately 1,175.

The village lies on the A371, close to Castle Cary railway station and the River Brue, where the bridge dates from 1823.

Governance

The parish council has responsibility for local issues, including setting an annual precept (local rate) to cover the council's operating costs and producing annual accounts for public scrutiny. The parish council evaluates local planning applications and works with the local police, district council officers, and neighbourhood watch groups on matters of crime, security, and traffic. The parish council's role also includes initiating projects for the maintenance and repair of parish facilities, as well as consulting with the district council on the maintenance, repair, and improvement of highways, drainage, footpaths, public transport, and street cleaning. Conservation matters (including trees and listed buildings) and environmental issues are also the responsibility of the council.

The village falls within the Non-metropolitan district of South Somerset, which was formed on 1 April 1974 under the Local Government Act 1972, having previously been part of Wincanton Rural District. The district council is responsible for local planning and building control, local roads, council housing, environmental health, markets and fairs, refuse collection and recycling, cemeteries and crematoria, leisure services, parks, and tourism.

Somerset County Council is responsible for running the largest and most expensive local services such as education, social services, libraries, main roads, public transport, policing and fire services, Trading Standards, waste disposal and strategic planning.

It is also part of the Somerton and Frome county constituency represented in the House of Commons of the Parliament of the United Kingdom. It elects one Member of Parliament (MP) by the first past the post system of election, and was part of the South West England constituency of the European Parliament prior to Britain leaving the European Union in January 2020, which elected seven MEPs using the d'Hondt method of party-list proportional representation.

Landmarks

The nearby Hadspen house and garden includes the house which is a grade II* listed building, and a private park with formal gardens created by William Player.

Education

There is a Secondary School called Ansford Academy which has over 700 students aged 11–16.

Religious sites

There is a Methodist church and the Church of England St Andrew's, which has a 15th-century tower, with the remainder of the church being rebuilt by Charles Edmund Giles in 1861.

Notable residents

It was the birthplace of clergyman and diarist James Woodforde and, in 1763, his nephew Samuel Woodforde.

References

External links

 

Villages in South Somerset
Civil parishes in Somerset
Castle Cary